Philipose is a surname. Notable people with the surname include: 

John Philipose, Indian New Testament scholar
Pamela Philipose, Indian journalist and researcher
Thomas Philipose (1942–2018), Indian soldier

Surnames from given names
Indian surnames
Malayalam-language surnames